The North Island is a New Zealand men's domestic rugby union team composed of the best of the North Island's players. They have a rivalry with the South Island, having played them in the North vs South rugby union match between 1897 and 2012, when they lost 32–34. The match was to be played on 29 August 2020 at Eden Park, however this was delayed a week later on 5 September playing at Sky Stadium, due to the ongoing COVID-19 pandemic.

References

New Zealand rugby union teams
1897 establishments in New Zealand